Brent Steele (born August 25, 1947) is a former Republican member of the Indiana Senate, representing the 44th District from 2004 to 2016. He served in the Indiana House of Representatives from 1995 to 2002 before succeeding Becky Skillman as state senator for the 44th. Steele has supported displaying the Ten Commandments on government property. Steele and his family competed on the game show Family Feud at least twice.

References

External links
Virtual Office of Senator Brent Steele official Indiana State Legislature site
 

1947 births
Living people
Republican Party Indiana state senators
21st-century American politicians